Tomislav Lepan (born 14 August 1979) is a Croatian male canoeist who won two medals at senior level at the Wildwater Canoeing World Championships.

References

External links
 

1979 births
Living people
Croatian male canoeists